Stephen Collins, an Irish journalist and author, is a Political Correspondent with The Irish Times. He was previously political editor at the Irish newspapers The Irish Press, The Sunday Press, the Sunday Tribune, and most recently The Irish Times. which he joined in January 2006, under the editorship of the former Progressive Democrats T.D., Geraldine Kennedy. He studied for a B.A. in History and Politics and an M.A. in politics at University College Dublin.

In 1983–84 Collins sat on the New Ireland Forum, a body designed to establish common ground amongst Irish nationalist political parties. His later criticisms of Charles Haughey—who also sat on the Forum—were, it has been said, primarily moulded by the complacency with which he had seen Jack Lynch's handling of the Arms Crisis of 1970. Collins has published books on the Cosgrave political dynasty and, more recently, on the foundation of the Progressive Democrats political party, called Breaking the Mould. His father Willie Collins (1916-2006) was a journalist with the Irish Press and was deputy editor of The Sunday Press, and Stephen is the older brother of Sunday Independent News Editor Liam Collins.

References

 

Year of birth missing (living people)
Living people
Irish columnists
Irish non-fiction writers
Irish male non-fiction writers
People educated at Oatlands College
Sunday Tribune people
The Irish Press people
The Sunday Press people
The Irish Times people
21st-century Irish journalists